The Neptune 24 is an American trailerable sailboat that was designed as a cruiser and first built in 1978.

Production
The design was built by Capital Yachts in Harbor City, California, United States, starting in 1978, but it is now out of production.

Design
The Neptune 24 is a recreational keelboat, built predominantly of fiberglass, with wood trim. It has a masthead sloop rig, a raked stem, a plumb transom, a transom-hung rudder controlled by a tiller and a fixed fin keel or stub shoal draft keel, with an optional centerboard. It displaces  and carries  of ballast. A standard height mast or tall rig was offered.

The boat is normally fitted with a small  outboard motor for docking and maneuvering.

The design has sleeping accommodation for six people, with a double "V"-berth in the bow cabin, two straight settee berths in the main cabin and an aft cabin with a small double quarter berth on the port side. The galley is located on the starboard side just forward of the companionway ladder. The galley is "L"-shaped and is equipped with a two-burner stove, icebox and a sink. The head is located just aft of the bow cabin on the port side.

Operational history
The boat is supported by a class club, Capital Yachts Info.

In a 2010 review Steve Henkel wrote, "Capital Yachts ... offered this commodious vessel in several configurations: shoal draft long keel ... or deep fin keel (at 5-foot draft not easily tailerable or launchable without a crane), and standard rig or tall rig. Some owners of used boats report having boats with shoal keels and 'bilgeboards' or 'daggerboard.' We assume they mean a centerboard, apparently an option with the shoal keel. Best features: A poptop increases headroom to more than six feet, and a big forward hatch is a plus. Despite her beam being less than eight feet ... the Neptune 24's Space Index is best of the lot. That's due to the relatively high freeboard and bulbous trunk cabin, which increase interior space but at some sacrifice of external beauty. Worst features: Owners point out that two adults can't use the aft double (though, as the sales literature says somewhat enigmatically, '1 1/2 people can'), The same is true for the forward V-berth, unless the filler cushion is put in place, which virtually eliminates head use. Other owner complaints include poor windward ability in the shoal draft version, lack of a door on the head, and a stove positioned too close to the side of the boat and to curtains."

See also
List of sailing boat types

References

External links
Video: Neptune 24 Overview

Keelboats
1970s sailboat type designs
Sailing yachts
Trailer sailers
Sailboat types built in the United States
Sailboat types built by Capital Yachts